Jalan Bukit Mor or Jalan Mahmood (Johor state route J131) is a major road in Johor, Malaysia.

List of junctions

Roads in Johor